Endocellion is a genus of flowering plants in the daisy family Asteraceae.

There is only one accepted species, Endocellion glaciale, native to eastern Russia (Krasnoyarsk, Khabarovsk, Magadan).

References

Endemic flora of Russia
Monotypic Asteraceae genera
Senecioneae